Gary Owen (born 1972) is a Welsh playwright, and winner of the 2003 Meyer-Whitworth Award for new writing for the theatre.

Career
Owen attended Cambridge University before he went into theatre. He was writer in residence at Paines Plough between 2001 and 2002, and was previously script editor at BBC Wales Drama (1998–2000). His plays have been performed around the United Kingdom from London to the Edinburgh Festival Fringe, and abroad as far as Canada, Australia and Germany – in which Crazy Gary's Mobile Disco was performed in German at Theater in Der Fabrik, Dresden in February 2003.

His 2010 play Mrs Reynolds and the Ruffian was a nominee for the 2010 TMA Awards best new play. The production of Iphigenia in Splott (2015) at Sherman Theatre starring Sophie Melville was ranked by The Guardian writers as the 28th best theatre show since 2000. It was revived for another run in 2022 with Melville returning to her role.

Works

Theatre

 Crazy Gary's Mobile Disco (2001)
 Fags (2002)
 The Shadow of a Boy (2002)
 The Drowned World (2002)
 Amser Canser (2003) (in Welsh)
 The Low Hundreds (2003)
 Cold Harbour (2003)
 The Green (2003)
 Ghost City (2004)
 Hartleby, Oooglemore and Jeramee (2005)
 An Enemy for the People (2006)
 Mary Twice (2008)
 Amgen:Broken (2009)
 A Christmas Carol (2009)
 Mrs Reynolds and the Ruffian (2010)
 Love Steals Us From Loneliness (2010)
 Free Folk (2010)
 Blackthorn (2010)
 Perfect Match (2013)
 Pen-blwydd Poenus Pete (2014)
 Iphigenia In Splott (2015)
 Violence and Son (2015)
 Killology (2017)
 The Cherry Orchard (2017) (re-imagining)
 Romeo and Julie (2023)

Other

 "Osskah" (short story, published in the Doctor Who collection Short Trips: Snapshots) 2007

References

External links
Information about Owen on "Doolees"
List of owen's plays courtesy of "Theatre wales"
The letter to The Guardian
Client page at agents Curtis Brown

Welsh dramatists and playwrights
Living people
1972 births
People educated at Ysgol Brynteg